The Shattered Isle: Rebels Against the Mutant Master is a science fantasy tabletop role-playing game supplement designed by Kerie Campbell-Robson, Steve Perrin, and Sandy Petersen and published by Chaosium in 1987. Designed to be used with Hawkmoon or Stormbringer, it provides new rules, background, and adventures for a campaign set in Eire.

Plot summary
The Shattered Isle is a supplement of rules for aerial combat and vehicles, including tanks, armored personnel carriers, and helicopters, and adventure scenarios.

Publication history
The Shattered Isle was written by Steve Perrin, Sandy Petersen, and Kerie Campbell-Robson and was published by Chaosium in 1987 as a 64-page book.

Reception
Peter Green reviewed The Shattered Isle for White Dwarf #90 and stated that "Both adventures successfully capture the flavour of the Hawkmoon novels. They are very Moorcockian, containing those weird and baroque elements which make Michael Moorcock such a distinctive writer. Chaosium have done a good job with the Eternal Champion line. It should appeal to both Hawkmoon and Stormbringer players."

Reviews
White Wolf #8 (Dec./Jan., 1987)

References

Basic Role-Playing System
Fantasy role-playing game adventures
Michael Moorcock's Multiverse
Role-playing game supplements introduced in 1987